A feeder line is a secondary assembly line which provides parts for use in a primary assembly line. Researchers assert that the traditional level scheduling methodology of assembly line planning is not effective unless feeder lines provide parts to the primary assembly line.

Bibliography
 

Industrial processes